The 1956 College Football All-America team is composed of college football players who were selected as All-Americans by various organizations and writers that chose College Football All-America Teams in 1956. The seven selectors recognized by the NCAA as "official" for the 1956 season are (1) the American Football Coaches Association (AFCA), (2) the Associated Press (AP), (3) the Football Writers Association of America (FWAA), (4) the International News Service (INS), (5) the Newspaper Enterprise Association (NEA), (6) the Sporting News (SN), and (8) the United Press (UP).

Consensus All-Americans
For the year 1956, the NCAA recognizes seven published All-American teams as "official" designations for purposes of its consensus determinations. The following chart identifies the NCAA-recognized consensus All-Americans and displays which first-team designations they received.

All-American selections for 1956

Ends
Ron Kramer, Michigan (College Football Hall of Fame) (AFCA; AP-1; UP-1; SN; INS-1; CP-1; NEA-1; WC; FWAA)
Joe Walton, Pittsburgh (AFCA; AP-1; UP-1; SN; CO-1; INS-1; CP-1; NEA-1; WC; FWAA)
Buddy Cruze, Tennessee (AP-3; UP-2; INS-2; CP-2; NEA-2;FWAA)
Bill Steiger, Washington State (AP-2, FWAA)
Walter Brodie, William & Mary (AP-2)
Lamar Lundy, Purdue (UP-2; INS-2; NEA-3)
Tom Maentz, Michigan (UP-3; CP-3; NEA-3)
Paul Lopata, Yale (AP-3)
Frank Gilliam, Iowa (UP-3; NEA-2)
Jack Johnson, Miami (CP-2)
Brad Bomba, Indiana (CP-3)
Ernie Pitts, Denver (INS-2)
John Bell, Oklahoma (INS-2)

Tackles
John Witte, Oregon State (AFCA, AP-1; FWAA UP-1; CO-1; INS-1; CP-1; NEA-1; WC)
Lou Michaels, Kentucky (College Football Hall of Fame) (AP-2; UP-1; CO-1; INS-2; CP-2; NEA-1; WC-1)
Alex Karras, Iowa , (College and Pro Football Hall of Fame) (AP-1; UP-2; INS-2; CP-1; NEA-2; FWAA)
Charlie Krueger, Texas A&M (AP-3, INS-1, CP-3)
Norm Hamilton, TCU (CP-3; NEA-2; FWAA)
Bob Hobert, Minnesota (AP-3; UP-3; NEA-3; FWAA)
Paul Wiggin, Stanford (AP-2; UP-2, SN, INS-2)
Ed Gray, Oklahoma (SN)
Mike Sandusky, Maryland (CP-2)
Esker Harris, UCLA (AP-2)

Guards
Jim Parker, Ohio State (College and Pro Football Hall of Fame) (AFCA, AP-1; UP-1; SN; INS-1; CP-1; NEA-1; WC; FWAA)
Bill Glass, Baylor (College Football Hall of Fame) (AFCA, AP-1; UP-1; SN; CO-1; INS-1; CP-2; NEA-1; WC-1; FWAA)
Sam Valentine, Penn State (AP-2; UP-2; INS-2; CP-1; NEA-2; NEA-2; FWAA)
John Barrow, Florida (Canadian Football Hall of Fame)(AP-3 CP-3; NEA-3; FWAA)
Allen Ecker, Georgia Tech (UP-2; INS-2; CP-3)
Dick Day, Washington (AP-3)
Stan Slater, Army (UP-3)
Bill Krisher, Oklahoma (UP-3)
John Owselchik, Yale (CP-2; NEA-3)
Dan Currie, Michigan State (INS-2)

Centers
Jerry Tubbs, Oklahoma (College Football Hall of Fame) (AFCA, AP-1; UP-1; INS-1; CP-1; NEA-1; WC; FWAA)
Don Stephenson, Georgia Tech (AP-2; UP-3; SN; NEA-3; FWAA)
 John Matsko, Michigan State (AP-3; UP-2; INS-2; CP-3; NEA-2)
Don Suchy, Iowa (INS-2; CP-2)
Jim Matheny, UCLA (INS-2)

Quarterbacks
John Brodie, Stanford (College Football Hall of Fame) (AFCA, AP-3; UP-2; CO-1; INS-1; CP-2; NEA-1; WC-1; FWAA-1)
Paul Hornung, Notre Dame (Heisman Trophy winner and College and Pro Football Hall of Fame) (AP-2; UP-1; INS-2; CP-1; NEA-2; FWAA-1)
Claude Benham, Columbia (INS-2; NEA-3)
Len Dawson, Purdue (UP-3)
Gene Newton, Tulane (CP-3)

Backs
Jim Brown, Syracuse (College and Pro Football Hall of Fame) (AFCA; AP-1; UP-1; CO-1; INS-1; CP-1; NEA-1; WC; FWAA)
Johnny Majors, Tennessee (College Football Hall of Fame) (AFCA; AP-1; UP-1; CO-1; INS-1; CP-2; NEA-1; WC; FWAA)
Tommy McDonald, Oklahoma (College and Pro Football Hall of Fame) (AFCA; AP-1; UP-1; CO-1; INS-1; CP-1; NEA-2; WC; FWAA)
Jack Pardee, Texas A&M (College Football Hall of Fame) (UP-3; INS-2; CP-1; NEA-2; FWAA)
Jim Crawford, Wyoming (AP-3; UP-3; INS-2; CP-2; NEA-1; FWAA)
Don Bosseler, Miami (AP-1; INS-2; CP-2; NEA-3)
Billy Ray Barnes, Wake Forest (AP-2; FWAA)
John David Crow, Texas A&M (AP-2; SN; INS-2; NEA-3)
Clendon Thomas, Oklahoma (UP-2; INS-2; CP-3)
Ken Ploen, Iowa (AP-2)
Jim Swink, TCU (AP-3; UP-2; INS-2)
Paige Cothren, Mississippi (UP-2)
Mel Dillard, Purdue (AP-3)
Jon Arnett, Southern California (UP-3; INS-2; NEA-2)
Bob McKeiver, Northwestern (CP-3)
John Bayuk, Colorado (INS-2; CP-3)
Joel Wells, Clemson  (NEA-3)
Paul Rotenberry, Georgia Tech (INS-2)
Dennis McGill, Yale (INS-2)
Earnel Durden, Oregon State (INS-2)

Key

Official selectors
 AFCA = American Football Coaches Association; selected by the votes of the 503 members of the AFCA and published in Collier's Weekly magazine,
 AP = Associated Press
 FWAA = Football Writers Association of America
 INS = International News Service
 NEA = Newspaper Enterprise Association
 SN = The Sporting News
 UP = United Press

Other selectors
 CP = Central Press Association, selected by college football team captains
 WC = Walter Camp Football Foundation

See also
 1956 All-Atlantic Coast Conference football team
 1956 All-Big Seven Conference football team
 1956 All-Big Ten Conference football team
 1956 All-Pacific Coast Conference football team
 1956 All-SEC football team
 1956 All-Southwest Conference football team

References

All-America Team
College Football All-America Teams